Ikada Stadium was a multi-use stadium in Jakarta, Indonesia, designed by the pioneering, Indonesian modern architect Liem Bwan Tjie. The stadium was named as an abbreviation of Ikatan Atletik Djakarta (Jakarta Athletic Bond). It was initially used as the stadium of Indonesia national football team matches as well as the 1951 Indonesian National Games. The capacity of the stadium was 30,000 spectators. It was Jakarta's largest stadium before it was replaced with Gelora Bung Karno in 1962.

The stadium was demolished in 1963 to make way to the Indonesian National Monument. Today the site is used for the Merdeka Square.

References

Cited works

External links
 Stadium history

Defunct sports venues in Jakarta
Defunct football venues in Indonesia
Defunct athletics (track and field) venues in Indonesia
Multi-purpose stadiums in Indonesia
Sports venues in Jakarta
Sports venues completed in 1951
1951 establishments in Indonesia
1963 disestablishments in Indonesia
Sports venues demolished in 1963
Venues of the 1962 Asian Games
Asian Games football venues